Surang is a 1953 film directed by V. Shantaram for his Rajkamal Kalamandir banner. The story and dialogue were by Vinod Kumar with music by Shivram Krishna and lyrics by Shewan Rizwi. The actor Chandrashekhar came into prominence with his role of a miner in the film. The rest of cast included Shashikala, Sheila Ramani, Vinod Kumar, Ulhas and Vikas.

The film was made at a time when Shantaram was producing his social films of "exceptional merit" such as Apna Desh (1949), Dahej, Parchhain (1952) and Teen Batti Char Raasta (1953). The film was about the plight of quarry workers, and the roles of Chandrashekhar as the quarry worker and Shashikala as the crazy but astute girl were commended.

Plot
When one of the quarry workers dies, the management asks the workers to continue, saying people die every day. This incites the workers, and, led by one of them (Chandrashekhar), they approach the owner, whose daughter (Sheila Ramani) is not sympathetic to their arguments. The owner promises to look after the fate of their children and the workers return to work. The mad girl Pagli (crazy) (Shashikala) laughs at the departing miners as she knows the promises are false. Vikas, the Seth's son, just returning after completing his medical studies, gets interested in her. The story follows the change in the daughter's behaviour over a period of time as she interacts with the workers and Pagli and the Seth's son's relationship.

Cast
 Shashikala
 Sheila Ramani
 Vinod Kumar
 Vikas
 Chandrashekhar
 Keshavrao Date
 Ullhas
 Jogendra
 Gajendra

Crew

 Director: V. Shantaram
 Banner: Rajkamal Kalamandir
 Music: Shivram Krishna
 Lyrics: Shewan
 Story: Vinod Kumar
 Dialogue: Vinod Kumar
 Make-up: Vardam
 Assistant Director: Prabhat Kumar
 Cinematographer: G. Balkrishna, Kirtiwan
 Editing: Chintamani Borkar
 Art director: P. S. Kale
 Audiographer: A. K. Parmar
 Background music: Vasant Desai
 Choreographer: Arjun

Soundtrack
The music was composed by Shivram Krishna, with lyrics by Shewan Rizvi. The playback singing was by Lata Mangeshkar, Asha Bhosle, Manna Dey and Sulochana Kadam.

Song list

References

External links
[ Official site]

1952 films
1950s Hindi-language films
Films directed by V. Shantaram